Gustave Hervé (Brest, January 2, 1871 – Paris, October 25, 1944) was a French politician. At first, he was a fervent antimilitarist socialist and pacifist, but he later turned to equally zealous ultranationalism, declaring his patriotisme in 1912 when released from 26 months of imprisonment for anti-militarist publishing activities.

Career
In 1901 Gustave Hervé had attained notoriety with an apparent image of the tricolor planted in a dungpile.  Soon he forged a prominent antimilitarist movement called Hervéism. When France's socialist parties united in 1905, Hervé led the most extreme faction. Soon Hervéists created a weekly newspaper, La Guerre sociale, which attempted to unite the extreme French left. Before World War I Hervé was one of the most strident voices within both French socialism and the Second International, advocating violent, revolutionary means to prevent war. Six years of sensational and provocative campaigns and organizations failed to implement his ideas. Despite his dedication, the quixotic Hervé grew frustrated due to continuing leftist divisions. His disillusionment was connected to a rather naive reading of the increasingly anachronistic revolutionary tradition. Hervé was quite sincere, yet his romantic and eclectic socialism exhibited atavistic features. By 1914, he rallied to 'la patrie en danger' and in 1916 changed the name of his paper to La Victoire.

In 1919, Hervé and several prominent socialists created the Parti socialiste national (PSN), which promoted "class co-operation" and solidarity. This "national socialism" of Hervé was soon transformed into a form of "French fascism," and when Benito Mussolini took power in Italy in the March on Rome, Hervé heralded him as "my courageous Italian comrade."

Startling as his reversal may appear at first glance, Hervé's activist Insurrectional Socialism actually included an antimaterialistic critique of society. That critique was crucial to his evolving national socialism which looked to the nation and its religious traditions to remedy social divisions and decadence. His rechristened newspaper and its associated groups offered various authoritarian panaceas to end French disorder. Despite Hervé's marginalization during the interwar era and his general reluctance to engage in violence, his Neo-Bonapartist views and admiration for Mussolini must inescapably be included within what Philippe Burrin has called "the fascist drift".

The PSN would never attract many supporters, so Hervé attempted to resurrect the party in 1925 as the Parti de la République autoritaire. In 1927, the name reverted to the Parti socialiste national. When Marcel Bucard became involved with the magazine La Victoire, it was renamed once again to La Milice socialiste in 1932.

Later in 1936, Hervé rallied behind French war hero Marshal Philippe Pétain, but distanced himself from him in 1940. He died in 1944, and was actually harassed during the war years by Vichy France officials for his criticism published in La Victoire.

The Italian-born soprano, and protégée of Arturo Toscanini, Herva Nelli was named after Gustave Hervé.

Further reading

Michael B. Loughlin, From Revolutionary Theater to Reactionary Litanies: Gustave Hervé (1871-1944) at the Extremes of the French Third Republic (New York: Peter Lang Co., 2016), 1100 pages

References

External links
 
 
 Gustave Hervé Archive at marxists.org

1871 births
1944 deaths
Politicians from Brest, France
Politicians of the French Third Republic
French socialists
French fascists